In linguistics (especially generative grammar), complementizer or complementiser is a functional category (part of speech) that includes those words that can be used to turn a clause into the subject or object of a sentence. For example, the word that may be called a complementizer in English sentences like Mary believes that it is raining. The concept of complementizers is specific to certain modern grammatical theories; in traditional grammar, such words are normally considered conjunctions. The standard abbreviation for complementizer is C.

Category of C

C as head of CP
The complementizer is often held to be the syntactic head of a full clause, which is therefore often represented by the abbreviation CP (for complementizer phrase). Evidence that the complementizer functions as the head of its clause includes that it is commonly the last element in a clause in head-final languages like Korean or Japanese, in which other heads follow their complements, whereas it appears at the start of a clause in head-initial languages such as English, where heads normally precede their complements. The trees below illustrate the phrase "Taro said that he married Hanako" in Japanese and English; syntactic heads are marked in red, demonstrating that C falls in head-final position in Japanese, and in head-initial position in English.

Sources of C 
It is common for the complementizers of a language to develop historically from other syntactic categories, a process known as grammaticalization.

C can develop from a determiner 
Across the languages of the world, it is especially common for pronouns or determiners to be used as complementizers (e.g., English that).

I read in the paper that it's going to be cold today.

C can develop from an interrogative word 
Another frequent source of complementizers is the class of interrogative words. It is especially common for a form that otherwise means what to be borrowed as a complementizer, but other interrogative words are often used as well, as in the following colloquial English example, where unstressed how is roughly equivalent to that.

I read in the paper how it's going to be cold today.

C can develop from a preposition 
With non-finite clauses, English for in sentences like I would prefer for there to be a table in the corner shows a preposition that has arguably developed into a complementizer. (The sequence for there in this sentence is not a prepositional phrase under this analysis.)

C can develop from a verb 
In many languages of West Africa and South Asia, the form of the complementizer can be related to the verb say. In these languages, the complementizer is also called the quotative. The quotative performs many extended functions in these languages.

Empty complementizers
Some analyses allow for the possibility of invisible or "empty" complementizers. An empty complementizer is considered to be present when there is not a word, even though the rules of grammar expect one. The complementizer (for example, "that") is usually said to be understood – i.e., an English speaker knows it is there, and so it does not need to be said. Its existence in English has been proposed based on the following type of alternation:

He hopes you go ahead with the speech
He hopes that you go ahead with the speech

Because that can be inserted between the verb and the embedded clause without changing the meaning, the original sentence without a visible complementizer would be reanalyzed as

He hopes ∅C you go ahead with the speech

Where the symbol ∅C represents the empty (or "null") complementizer, this suggests another interpretation of the earlier "how" sentence:

I read in the paper <how> ∅C [it's going to be cold today]

where "how" serves as a specifier to the empty complementizer. This allows for a consistent analysis of another troublesome alternation:

The man <whom> ∅C [I saw yesterday] ate my lunch!
The man <OP> ∅C [I saw yesterday] ate my lunch!
The man <OP> that [I saw yesterday] ate my lunch!
where "OP" represents an invisible interrogative known as an operator.

In a more general sense, the proposed empty complementizer parallels the suggestion of near-universal empty determiners.

Various analyses have been proposed to explain when the empty complementizer ∅ can substitute for a phonologically overt complementizer.  One explanation is that complementizers are eligible for omission when they are epistemically neutral or redundant. For example, in many environments, English's epistemically neutral that and Danish's at can be omitted. In addition, if a complementizer expresses a semantic meaning that is also expressed by another marker in the phrase, the complementizer carrying the redundant meaning may be omitted. Consider the complementizer be in Mangap-Mbula, which expresses uncertainty, in the following example: 

Here, the marker ko also expresses epistemic uncertainty, so be can be replaced by the phonologically null complementizer without affecting meaning or grammaticality.

Complementizers are present in a wide range of environments; in some, C is obligatorily overt (i.e., cannot be replaced by the empty complementizer). For example, in English, CPs selected for by manner-of-speaking verbs (whisper, mutter, groan, etc) resist C-drop:
Barney whispered *(that) Wilma was dating Fred.
Barney said (that) Wilma was dating Fred.

In other environments, the complementizer can be omitted without loss of grammaticality, but may result in semantic ambiguity. For example, consider the English sentence "The newspaper reported that a new mayor was elected and (that) there was a riot." Listeners can infer a causal relationship between the two events reported by the newspaper: a new mayor was elected, and as a result, there was a riot. Alternatively, the events may be interpreted as independent of each other. The non-causal interpretation is more likely when the second complementizer that is present, whereas the causal interpretation is more likely when an empty complementizer is present. 

The ambiguity here arises because the sentence where the second complementizer is empty may also be interpreted as simply having no second complementizer. In the first case, the sentence involves coordination of CPs, which lends itself more easily to a non-causal interpretation, but the latter case involves coordination of TPs, which is the necessary structure for a causal interpretation. Partial syntax trees for the possible structures are given below.

Selectional restrictions imposed by C
As a syntactic head, C always selects for a complement tense phrase (TP) whose syntax and semantics are dictated by the choice of C.  The choice of C can determine whether the associated TP is finite or non-finite, whether it carries the semantic meaning of certainty or uncertainty, whether it expresses a question or an assertion, et cetera.

Propositions vs. indirect questions 
The following complementizers are available in English: that, for, if, whether, ∅.   

If and whether form CPs that express indirect questions:

John wonders whether / if it is raining outside. 

In contrast, complementizers for, that, as well as the phonologically null complementizer ∅ introduce "declarative or non-interrogative" CPs.

John thinks ∅ it is raining outside.
John thinks that it is raining outside.
John prefers for it to be raining.

Finite vs. non-finite TPs 
Tense phrases in English can be divided into finite (tensed) clauses or non-finite (tenseless) clauses. The former includes an indication of the relative time when its content occurs; the latter has no overt indication of time: compare John will leave (John's leaving will take place in the future) with John wants to leave (we are unsure when John is leaving). 

Certain complementizers strictly select for finite clauses (denoted [+finite]) while others select for non-finite clauses (denoted [-finite]).

Complementizers if, that require [+tense] TP:
Mary wishes that she will win the game. (future)
Mary believes if she wins the game, she can date John. (present)
Complementizer for requires a [-tense] TP:
Mary hopes for Kate to win the game. (infinitive)

Complementizer whether allows either [+tense] or [-tense] TP:

John wonders whether Mary will win the game. (future)
Mary wonders whether to win the game or not. (infinitive)

Epistemic selection 
Complementizers frequently carry epistemic meaning - that is, meaning about the speaker's degree of certainty (for example, whether they are doubtful), or the speaker's source of information (for example, whether they are making an inference, or have direct evidence). Contrast the meaning of "if" and "that" in English:
John doesn't know if Mary is there.
John doesn’t know that Mary is there.
“If” signals that the associated tense phrase must carry the epistemic meaning of uncertainty. In contrast, “that” is epistemically neutral. This contrast is not uncommon cross-linguistically: in languages with only two complementizers, one is frequently neutral, while the other carries the meaning of uncertainty. One such language is Lango (a Nilotic language spoken in Uganda):

Additional languages with this neutrality/uncertainty complementizer contrast include several European languages:

In other languages, complementizers are richer in epistemic meaning. For example, in Mangap-Mbula, an Austronesian language of Papua New Guinea, the following complementizers are available:

More generally, complementizers have been found to express the following values cross-linguistically: certainty, (general) uncertainty, probability, negative probability/falsehood, apprehension, and reportativity.

Complementizers in Itzaj Maya also demonstrate epistemic meaning. For instance, English that and Itzaj Maya kej are used not only to identify complements, but also to introduce relative clauses:

Itzaj Maya (Hofling, 2000: 496, 495)

(1) a.

Taken from Boye (2015), page 3  

(1) b. 

Taken from Boye (2015), page 3 

(1a) introduces a subordinate clause and (1b) introduces a conditional clause, similar to English. The former subtype that can be defined in terms of information source and includes meanings glossed as direct evidence, indirect evidence, hearsay, inferential. The latter one if can be defined in terms of degree of certainty and includes meanings glossed as certainty, probability, epistemic possibility, doubt. Thus, epistemic meaning as a whole can be defined in terms of the notion of justificatory support.

Abbreviations adapted from Boye (2015) page 15 and Hofling (1998) page 225-226.

Complementizer stacking 

But not only that, Itzaj Maya can combine the neutral complementizer ke with the non-neutral, waj. This is illustrated in examples (2a), where the neutral complementizer ke occurs alone, and (2b), where it is optionally inserted in front of the uncertainty complementizer waj:

Itzaj Maya (Hofling, 2000: 495, 506)

(2) a.

Taken from Boye (2015), page 9

(2) b.

Taken from Boye (2015), page 9 

In (1a,b) and (2a) we saw each complementizer can be licensed once within the clause, but in (2b) we observe the significant difference of Itzaj Maya from English. In English we are able to license multiple C as long as the clause is completed with the embedded V or D. For example, I saw that fox that ran towards the garden that Tommy took care of. In such cases, C can appear as the complement of V or D many times. However, CP-recursion in two tiers or CP appearing as an immediate complement of maximal projection CP cannot be allowed in English. This action of Complementizer Stacking is realised as ungrammatical.      
      

In Scandinavian languages, however, we see this phenomenon of complementizer stacking. For example, researchers observed the two basic types of CP-recursion that occur independently in Danish: a CP with V2 (i.e. a CP headed by a lexical predicate in its head position) will be referred as CP ("big CP"), whereas a CP without V2 (i.e. CP headed by a non-lexical element) will be referred to as cP ("little cP").      

 [cP c° [– LEXICAL]] ("little cP")
 [cP C° [+ LEXICAL]] ("big CP")

Adapted from Nyvad et al., (2017) page 453.

The case of little/big CPs are comparable to "VP shell" structure in English where it introduces a small v in the higher position in the tree, and big V in the lower position in the tree.

We also see in the examples, Danish allows complementizer stacking in constructions involving subject extraction from complement and relative clauses in colloquial speech:

(3) a.

(3) b.

Taken from Nyvad et al., (2017) page 463-464

We observe that complementizers are indeed stacked together in the beginning of the clause, acting as a complement of DP. CP-recusion structure on the right is applied for each of the clause, which points to evidence of complementizer stacking in Danish. In addition, we note the combination of som at der in (3a) is only possible in one specific order, which lead the researchers to believe that som may not require an empty operator in its Spec-CP position.

In various languages

Assyrian Neo-Aramaic
Though it is less common in casual speech, and more so in formal conversation.

Hebrew

In Hebrew (both Modern and Ancient) two complementizers coexist: שֶ , which is either related to the relativizer ‘asher ( < Akkadian ‘ashru ‘place’) and/or to the pronominal Proto-Semitic dhu ('this'); and כִּי [ki], which is also used as a conjunction meaning 'because, when'. In modern usage, the latter is reserved for more formal writing.

American Sign Language 
While some manual complementizers exist in American Sign Language they are usually expressed non-manually by facial expressions. Conditional clauses, for example, are indicated by raised eye-brows. If a manual complementizer is used it is also accompanied by a facial expression. The non-manual marking of complementizers is a common phenomenon found in many sign languages and it has even been suggested by Fabian Bross that C-categories are universally marked with the face in sign languages.

See also
 X-bar theory#Structure of S'
 Dependent clause
 ECM verb
 That-clause

Notes

References
 Bjorkman, Bronwyn M. et al. “A syntactic answer to a pragmatic puzzle: The case of asymmetric and.” (2013).
 Boye, K. (2012). Epistemic meaning. In Epistemic Meaning. De Gruyter Mouton.
 Boye, K., van Lier, E., & Theilgaard Brink, E. (2015). Epistemic complementizers: A cross-linguistic survey. Language Sciences (Oxford), 51(Sep), 1-17. https://doi.org/10.1016/j.langsci.2015.04.001
 Hofling, C. A. (2000). Itzaj maya grammar. University of Utah Press.
 Kaltenböck, Gunther. “‘… That Is the Question': Complementizer Omission in Extraposed That-Clauses.” English Language and Linguistics, vol. 10, no. 2, 2006, pp. 371–396., doi:10.1017/S1360674306001961.
 Legate, Julie Anne. (2010). On how how is used instead of that. Natural Language and Linguistic Theory 28:121-134.
 Noonan, Michael. A grammar of Lango. Vol. 7. Walter de Gruyter, 2011.
 Nordström, Jackie; Boye, Kasper (2016-07-11), "Complementizer semantics in the Germanic languages", Complementizer Semantics in European Languages, De Gruyter, pp. 131–174, retrieved 2022-04-15
 Nyvad, Anne Mette; Christensen, Ken Ramshøj; Vikner, Sten (2017-01-01). "CP-recursion in Danish: A cP/CP-analysis". The Linguistic Review. 34 (3). doi:10.1515/tlr-2017-0008. ISSN 0167-6318.
 
 Sportiche, D., Koopman, H. J., & Stabler, E. P. (2014;2013;). An introduction to syntactic analysis and theory (1st;1; ed.). John Wiley & Sons Inc.

Syntactic categories
Parts of speech
Grammatical marker type